This is a list of events in Scottish television from 1976.

Events
1 April – Debut of the Scottish soap Garnock Way, a short-lived soap that was made for ITV.
3 April – The first edition of BBC Scotland's rural affairs series Landward is broadcast. It was shown on Sunday lunchtimes as an opt-out, as the rest of the UK received Farming, and from 1988 Countryfile.
12 May – Transmission of the 1976 European Cup Final from Hampden Park, the biggest sporting outside-broadcast ever undertaken by an ITV company.

Debuts

BBC
3 April – Landward (1976–Present)
Unknown – Public Account (1976–1978)

ITV
1 April – Garnock Way (1976–1979)

Television series
Scotsport (1957–2008)
Reporting Scotland (1968–1983; 1984–present)
Top Club (1971–1998)
Scotland Today (1972–2009)
Sportscene (1975–Present)

Ending this year
31 August – Sutherland's Law (1973–1976)

Births
21 January – Kirsty Gallacher, television presenter
12 February – Jenni Falconer, television presenter
Unknown – Polly Frame, actress
Unknown – Bryan Kirkwood, television producer

Deaths
11 February – Charlie Naughton, 89, comedian

See also
1976 in Scotland

References

 
Television in Scotland by year
1970s in Scottish television